Nepal Academy of Fine Arts (NAFA) is the umbrella organization of Nepali artists, researchers and art critics, and an arts institution for research and for exhibitions. A museum in Kathmandu, in a neoclassical building from the 1930s, presents collections of both traditional and contemporary paintings and other works. It was formerly part of Nepal Academy. The Nepal Academy of Fine Arts has also published a number of books about art and Nepali artists.

History 
It was established on 13 April 2010 (31 Chaitra 2066 BS) by legislative parliament of Nepal and the operations were started on 15 April 2010 (2 Baisakh 2067 BS). The academy is located at Sita Bhawan, a palace built by Bhim Shamsher JBR in 1928 for his wife, Deela Kumari Devi. Kiran Manandhar served as the founding Chancellor of the academy.

Academic Council and Academic Assembly 
NAFA has two constituent parts - Academic Council and Academic Assembly. The major function of the Academic Assembly is to make policies and programmes for the development of Nepali art. The major function of the Academic Council  is to execute those policies and programmes in association with Nepali artists. The Academy Council also collaborates with other art organizations occasionally. The Academic Council consists of Chancellor, Vice-Chancellor, Member Secretary and the Members of Academic Council. Each cabinet serves for 5 years.

Academic Councils

First Council

Second Council

Third Council

Departments 
As of 2022, the departments in the academy are as follows:
 Traditional Art
 Sculpture
 Folk Art
 Painting
 Handicraft
 Architecture and other Creative Arts

Awards 
The academy grants many awards and honours to various artists for their contribution to Nepali artform. The awards given by the organization are:

 National Araniko Award (Rashtriya Araniko Samman)
 National Fine Arts Awards (Rashtriya Lalit Kala Puraskar)
 Traditional Painting
 Modern Painting
 Modern Sculpture
 Traditional sculpture
 Folk Art
 Handicraft
 Architecture and other Creative Arts
 Special Awards
 Traditional Painting
 Modern Painting
 Modern Sculpture
 Traditional sculpture
 Folk Art
 Handicraft
 Architecture and other Creative Arts
 Province-level Awards (An award from artist from each of the seven provinces)
 National Fine Arts Journalism Award (Lalit Kala Rashtriya Patrakarita Puraskar)
 National Fine Arts Writing Award (Lalit Kala Rashtriya Lekhan Puraskar)

The awards are presented annually. National Araniko Award is felicitated to two artists every years. The winners of the National Araniko Award are presented with a cash prize of रु100,000 and National Fine Arts Awards with रु60,000 for each category. Similarly, the Special and Province-level Awards carries a cash prize of रु25,000 for each category or province.

See also 

 Nepal Academy
 Nepal Art Council
 National Museum of Nepal

References

External links 
 http://nafanepal.org (Website of NAFA)

2010 establishments in Nepal
Nepalese art
Museums in Kathmandu
National academies of arts and humanities
Art museums and galleries in Nepal